The RēR Quarterly (also known as Rē Records Quarterly and RēR Records Quarterly) was an English "quarterly" sound-magazine comprising an LP record and a magazine. It was published at irregular intervals between 1985 and 1997 by Recommended Records and November Books, and edited by English percussionist, lyricist and music theorist Chris Cutler. It was sold internationally by Recommended Records via mail order and in specialist record shops.

A total of thirteen issues were published (four volumes of four, four, three and two issues respectively) plus two "collection" issues featuring music selections from volumes 1 and 2. From volume 4 the LP was replaced by a CD and the CD and the magazine (now entitled unFILEd: The RēR Sourcebook) were sold separately or together as a set.

Background
The idea for RēR Quarterly began in 1982 when Recommended Records released the Recommended Records Sampler, a sampler double album by various artists that contained newly recorded and previously unreleased work by musicians and groups on the Recommended Records catalogue at the time.

The record in each issue of RēR Quarterly contained previously unreleased music by artists from across the world, including commissioned pieces, projects and live recordings. The A4 magazine (varying from 42 to 112 pages per issue) included artwork and theoretical and practical articles on music, often by the composers and performers featured on the record. In keeping with the goals of Recommended Records and its prime mover, Rock in Opposition, a number of new musicians and groups appeared on the records, many having their music published internationally for the first time.

Editor Chris Cutler described the RēR Quarterly as:

Distribution
RēR Quarterly was distributed primarily to international subscribers by Recommended Records in London. Individual issues were also sold by the record label and other specialist record stores. Subscribers received special Subscription Editions that were numbered and signed, and included "something extra". For example, issue 1/1 included additional artwork by Peter Blegvad from his and John Greaves's 1977 album, Kew. Rhone., and issue 1/2 contained a cassette tape of Soviet pop songs from the early 1980s (at that time musicians in the former Soviet Union had little to no exposure in the West).

Name
When the RēR Quarterly was first published in 1985, it was entitled The Rē Records Quarterly, "Rē" being the label Cutler had set up for his own projects in 1978 alongside Recommended Records which served for distribution, mailorder and as a label for outside projects. In 1988 the name changed to The RēR Records Quarterly since the distinction between the two operations no longer needed to be marked. In 1994 the magazine title was reduced to The RēR Quarterly, which remained until it mutated again into the Sourcebook series.

Frequency
While RēR Quarterly was intended to be a quarterly sound-magazine, the gaps between issues varied from four months to four years. Cutler remarked that "It was always hard to get sufficient material of quality for the Quarterly, and so it always took a long time to prepare each issue." Most of the pieces featured on the disc and magazine were commissioned, and as the magazine's circulation was small and it received no subsidy (each issue generally ran at a loss), the contributors received very little for their work. In addition, Cutler was not a full-time editor of the magazine and preparing each issue had to be squeezed into his schedule of recording, touring and running Recommended Records.

Reception
Paul Oldfield wrote in the English music newspaper Melody Maker in 1985: "[RēR Quarterly] is the pursuit of unimaginable, packed in artwork of giddy luminescence."

In a review of Vol. 4 No. 1 at AllMusic, François Couture wrote that the music on the CD covers a broad range of styles, and that "[i]t takes wide ears and a solid stomach to switch from Cornelius Cardew's sweet-and-sour orchestral music to N.O.R.M.A.'s street band exuberance". He praised the tracks by Thinking Plague, Tom Nunn, Al Margolis and N.O.R.M.A., and said the album is "important" because pieces by Les Sales Combles, Diledadafish and Koongoortoog are the only recorded works left by these "occulted projects". Couture described this CD as "an accurate snapshot" of avant-garde music at the time, and gave it 3 stars out of 5.

Tom Schulte gave the Vol. 4 No. 2 CD 3 stars out of 5 in a review at AllMusic. He wrote that the album highlights include "[w]ave-like shapes of ambient noise" in "Feu Brilliant" by Keith Rowe and Alaid De Phillips, and extracts from a live radio performance in "After Hours" / "The Colour of Blood" by Shelley Hirsch, Jon Rose and Chris Cutler. Schulte called the latter a "very interesting listen" and described it as a "collage of conversation and instrumentation" that sounds like a "bizarre radio play".

Issues

Volume 1
All tracks written by the artist, except where noted.

Source Discogs

Source Discogs

Source Discogs

Source Discogs

Volume 2
All tracks written by the artist, except where noted.

Source Discogs

Source Discogs

Source Discogs

Source Discogs

Volume 3
All tracks written by the artist, except where noted.

Source Discogs

Source Discogs

Source Discogs

Volume 4
All tracks written by the artist, except where noted.

Source Discogs

Source Discogs

Selections
All tracks written by the artist, except where noted.

Source Discogs

Source Discogs

Footnotes

Album series
Music magazines published in the United Kingdom
Quarterly magazines published in the United Kingdom
Chris Cutler
Defunct magazines published in the United Kingdom
Magazines established in 1985
Magazines disestablished in 1997
Irregularly published magazines published in the United Kingdom
1985 establishments in the United Kingdom